The New Zealand women's national cricket team toured India in February and March 1985. They played against India in three Test matches and six One Day Internationals, with the Test series ending as a 0–0 draw and the ODI series ending as a 3–3 draw.

Squads

Tour Matches

2-day match: East Zone v New Zealand

40-over match: Women's Cricket Association of India President's XI v New Zealand

WODI Series

1st ODI

2nd ODI

3rd ODI

4th ODI

5th ODI

6th ODI

WTest Series

1st Test

2nd Test

3rd Test

References

External links
New Zealand Women tour of India 1984/85 from Cricinfo

New Zealand women's national cricket team tours
Women's international cricket tours of India